Ronald Patrick "Chico" Maki (August 17, 1939 – August 24, 2015) was a Canadian ice hockey forward. Maki played his entire National Hockey League (NHL) career with the Chicago Black Hawks, starting in the 1960–61 NHL season, and ultimately retiring after the 1975–76 season.

Playing career
Maki played junior hockey with the St. Catharines Teepees, and was team captain when they won the 1960 Memorial Cup. He won the Dudley "Red" Garrett Memorial Award as American Hockey League (AHL) rookie of the year while playing for the Buffalo Bisons in 1961. Maki then dressed for games 1 and 2 of the 1961 Stanley Cup Finals, but did not play; Chicago still included his name on the Stanley Cup when they won it that year.

Personal life
He was the older brother of former NHL player Wayne Maki, who died of brain cancer in 1974. Maki also bought the Hillcrest Restaurant and Motel, which he later called Chico Maki's Inn. He was of Finnish descent.

Career statistics

References

External links

Picture of Chico Maki's Name on the 1961 Stanley Cup Plaque

1939 births
2015 deaths
Canadian ice hockey forwards
Chicago Blackhawks players
Ice hockey people from Ontario
Sportspeople from Sault Ste. Marie, Ontario
Stanley Cup champions
Canadian people of Finnish descent